The Greene Avenue station was a station on the demolished BMT Lexington Avenue Line in Brooklyn, New York City. It was originally built on May 13, 1885, and had two tracks and two side platforms.  It was located at the intersection of Lexington Avenue and Greene Avenue, and had a connection to the former Green and Gates Avenue trolley line. The station was close to the current Clinton and Washington Avenues station on the underground IND Crosstown Line. It closed on October 13, 1950.  The next southbound stop was DeKalb Avenue.  The next northbound stop was Franklin Avenue.

References

External links
 

BMT Lexington Avenue Line stations
Railway stations in the United States opened in 1885
Railway stations closed in 1950
Former elevated and subway stations in Brooklyn